Spøgelsestoget (English title: Ghost Train International) is a 1976 Danish family film directed by Bent Christensen. It is based on the 1923 play The Ghost Train by Arnold Ridley.

Cast
Dirch Passer as Theodor 'Teddy' T. Thönder
Kirsten Walther as Juliane de Preiss
Axel Strøbye as Chauffør Heinz-Otto von Münsterland
Preben Kaas as Richard Winther
Lisbet Dahl as Else Winther
Clara Østø as Frk. Erna Bunsen
Bjørn Puggaard-Müller as Stationsforstander ved Falck
Otto Brandenburg as Den mystiske Hr. K.
Ole Monty as Stationsfunktionær
Bent Christensen ...  Stationsfunktionær
Preben Mahrt as Stationsfunktionær
Kai Løvring as Opdager
Hans Christian Ægidius
Lars Lunøe as Mystisk togpassager
Leif Panduro as Mand der skubber trækvogn

External links

1976 films
1970s crime films
Danish children's films
1970s Danish-language films
Films directed by Bent Christensen
Rail transport films